Josip Čop (born 14 October 1954) is a Croatian retired footballer.

Club career
During his club career he played for NK Varteks, NK Zagreb, NK Hajduk Split and SK Sturm Graz.

International career
He made his debut for Yugoslavia in a June 1984 friendly match against Portugal, a preparation game for UEFA Euro 1984, and earned a total of 2 caps, scoring no goals. His second and final international was five days later against Spain. He was a non-playing squad member at Euro 84.

Post-playing career
He began his career in sport management as the Secretary General of the Football Federation of Croatia, FIFA delegate and UEFA delegate, as well as member of several UEFA committees (Stadium and Security Committee; Delegate Panel; Venue Director Panel; European Championship Committee U 21) and vice president of the UEFA European Championship Committee U 21.

From 1996 to 1998 Čop served as Secretary-General of the Croatian Football Federation. Since 2005, he is the Secretary-General of the Croatian Olympic Committee,  serving his third four-year term.

References

External links
 
Profile

1954 births
Living people
Sportspeople from Varaždin
Association football defenders
Yugoslav footballers
Yugoslavia international footballers
UEFA Euro 1984 players
NK Varaždin players
NK Zagreb players
HNK Hajduk Split players
SK Sturm Graz players
Yugoslav First League players
Austrian Football Bundesliga players
Yugoslav expatriate footballers
Expatriate footballers in Austria
Yugoslav expatriate sportspeople in Austria
Croatian sports executives and administrators